= Copper Creek mine =

Copper mine in Pinal County, Arizona

Coordinates: 32.7595°N 110.4798°W

Copper Creek Mine
- Interactive map of Copper Creek Mine
- Location: Pinal County, Arizona, United States
- Company: Faraday Copper Corp.
- Website: https://www.faradaycopper.com

The Copper Creek Project is a ~65 square kilometre property, 100% owned by Faraday Copper Corp. The project is located in Pinal County, Arizona, approximately 80 road kilometres from Tucson, Arizona.

Copper Creek is a large, undeveloped project, which hosts multiple breccia and porphyry copper deposits. The results of a Preliminary Economic Assessment (“PEA”) were released by the company in a news release dated May 3, 2023. The PEA contemplates an open pit mining followed by an underground operation over a 30+ year mine life.

As of 2023, the Canadian mining company Faraday Copper is planning underground and open mining in the area. The company purchased the Mercer Ranch for $10 million in March 2023, acquiring 6,000 acres (2,400 ha) adjacent to Copper Creek.

In April 2026 a lawsuit was filed against Arizona Bureau of Land Management for allegedly ignoring documented proof of Mexican Spotted Owl within the project boundaries.
